Flavobacterium cutihirudinis is a Gram-negative bacterium from the genus of Flavobacterium which has been isolated from the skin of a leech Hirudo verbana from Biebertal in Germany.

References

 

cutihirudinis
Bacteria described in 2013